Shazil Islam Ansari is an Indian politician and was a member of the Sixteenth Legislative Assembly of Uttar Pradesh in India. He represents the Bhojipura constituency of Uttar Pradesh and is a member of the Ittehad-e-Millat Council political party.

Early life and  education
Shazil Islam Ansari was born in Uttar Pradesh to Islam Sabir Ansari. He did his schooling at G.D. Birla Memorial School a boarding hostel in Ranikhet, Uttarakhand. 

He holds a Bachelor's degree from M. J. P. Rohilkhand University.

Political career
Shazil Islam Ansari has been a MLA for three terms. He represented the Bhojipura constituency and is a member of the Ittehad-e-Millat Council political party.

He lost his seat in the 2017 Uttar Pradesh Assembly election to Bahoran Lal Maurya of the Bharatiya Janata Party.
He won U.P. 2022 election  from Bhojipura.
He is very dedicated towards his duty because he is one of those politicians who are very sensitive for education system.
Now he is going to give petition for the release of fund to state government in order to establish an agriculture university in his constituency.

Posts held

See also
 Bhojipura (Assembly constituency)
 Sixteenth Legislative Assembly of Uttar Pradesh
 Uttar Pradesh Legislative Assembly

References 

Uttar Pradesh MLAs 2012–2017
Uttar Pradesh MLAs 2007–2012
Uttar Pradesh MLAs 2002–2007
People from Bareilly district
21st-century Indian Muslims
1976 births
Living people
Ittehad-e-Millat Council politicians
Samajwadi Party politicians from Uttar Pradesh
Bahujan Samaj Party politicians from Uttar Pradesh
Uttar Pradesh MLAs 2022–2027